Juhan Aare (20 February 1948 – 6 October 2021) was an Estonian journalist, politician, and the founder of the Estonian Green Movement (not to be confused with current Estonian Green Party) as well as one of the instigators of the Phosphorite War protest movement.

Since 3 December 2002, he was a member of the People's Union of Estonia. In the 1980s he was a journalist in the TV-program Panda, which dealt with environmental issues.

His younger brother was musician Tõnu Aare (1953–2021). In 1983, Juhan Aare married actress and film director Riina Hein. The couple divorced in 2000.

References

1948 births
2021 deaths
Politicians from Tallinn
People's Union of Estonia politicians
Members of the Congress of People's Deputies of the Soviet Union
Members of the Riigikogu, 1992–1995
Members of the Riigikogu, 1995–1999
Estonian journalists
20th-century Estonian writers
21st-century Estonian writers
University of Tartu alumni
Tallinn University alumni
Recipients of the Order of the National Coat of Arms, 4th Class